Abbas-e Gharbi Rural District is in Tekmeh Dash District of Bostanabad County, East Azerbaijan province, Iran. At the census of 2006, its population was 10,070 in 2,110 households; there were 8,451 inhabitants in 2,196 households at the following census of 2011; and in the most recent census of 2016, the population of the rural district was 7,243 in 2,112 households. The largest of its 28 villages was Alkhalaj, with 1,730 people.

References 

Bostanabad County

Rural Districts of East Azerbaijan Province

Populated places in East Azerbaijan Province

Populated places in Bostanabad County